WD repeat-containing protein 36 is a protein that in humans is encoded by the WDR36 gene.

This gene encodes a member of the WD repeat protein family. WD repeats are minimally conserved regions of approximately 40 amino acids typically bracketed by gly-his and trp-asp (GH-WD), which may facilitate formation of heterotrimeric or multiprotein complexes. Members of this family are involved in a variety of cellular processes, including cell cycle progression, signal transduction, apoptosis, and gene regulation. Mutations in this gene have been associated with adult-onset primary open-angle glaucoma (POAG).

References

Further reading